Albert Newsam (May 20, 1809 – November 20, 1864) was an American artist. Born deaf and based in Philadelphia, Pennsylvania, he created paintings and drawings, including portraits.

Early life

Albert Newsam was born in Steubenville, Ohio United States. He was born deaf and was orphaned. He was a creative child, and at age eleven he was taken to Philadelphia, Pennsylvania, by a William P. Davis who pretended to be deaf, and made money off of Newsam's talents. In 1820, Newsam was placed in the Pennsylvania School for the Deaf, where he attended school.

Mid-life and career

He started an engraving apprenticeship in 1827. He worked for Cephas G. Childs. Newsam trained under George Catlin, and other engravers. Newsam's work was published by Childs starting in 1829. After working for Childs, he became principal artist for Peter S. Duval. Newsam specialized in portraits, which he painted and also etched on stone to make lithographs. He also worked off of the work of photographers and artists, such as Henry Inman and Gilbert Stuart, among others. Newsam created portraits of politicians, religious figures, and wealthy people. He also created landscapes, medical illustrations, and sheet music.

Later life, death, and legacy

His eyesight started to decline in 1857. In 1859, Newsam experienced a stroke. This affected his ability to work, and ended his career.  He lived at the Living Home for the Sick and Well in Delaware until his death. His stay at the home was financially sponsored by his friends. He was interred at Laurel Hill Cemetery in Philadelphia. William James Campbell collected some of his lithographs. A collection of his prints is held by the Historical Society of Pennsylvania.

Notable collections
Albert Newsam (self-portrait), unknown, Pennsylvania Academy of the Fine Arts
Pennsylvania Institution for the Deaf and Dumb, 1851, The Library Company of Philadelphia

Further reading
Lang, Harry G. Deaf Persons in the Arts and Sciences: A Biographical Dictionary. Westport: Greenwood Publishing Group (1995). pp. 274–276.  
Stauffer, DMN. Lithographic Portraits of Albert Newsam. Philadelphia: Pennsylvania Magazine of History and Biography (1901).

References

1809 births
1864 deaths
Artists from Philadelphia
Burials at Laurel Hill Cemetery (Philadelphia)
Deaf artists
People from Steubenville, Ohio
American deaf people